The 2002 European Korfball Championship was held Catalonia from March 31 to April 7, with 10 national teams in competition. The matches were played in Terrassa, Badalona, Sant Boi de Llobregat and Mataró.

First round
Three best teams of each pool went to second round qualifying matches with The Netherlands and Belgium, that entered then in competition.

Second round qualifying matches

Second round
Pools C and D played for the title and pool E played for 7th to 10th places.

Finals

Final standings

See also
European Korfball Championship
International Korfball Federation

External links
International Korfball Federation

European Korfball Championship
2002 in korfball
Korfball in Catalonia
International sports competitions hosted by Catalonia
2002 in Catalan sport